Anna Maria Barbara "Miriam" Lips (born 1967) is a Dutch-born academic in New Zealand. She holds the chair in digital government at the Victoria University of Wellington.

Academic career
After a 1996 PhD titled  'Autonomie in kwaliteit: ambiguïteit in bestuurlijke communicatie over de ontwikkeling van kwaliteitszorg in het Hoger Onderwijs'  at the Erasmus University Rotterdam, she worked at University of Oxford and Tilburg University before moving to the Victoria University of Wellington.

Lip's work on digital inclusion has been covered by the press and she holds a number of appointments in government.

Selected works 
 Lips, Miriam. "E-government is dead: Long live public administration 2.0." Information Polity 17, no. 3, 4 (2012): 239–250.
 Taylor, John, Miriam Lips, and Joe Organ. "Information-intensive government and the layering and sorting of citizenship." Public Money and Management 27, no. 2 (2007): 161–164.
 Lips, Miriam. "E-government under construction: challenging traditional conceptions of citizenship." In E-government in Europe, pp. 61–75. Routledge, 2006.
 Taylor, John A., Miriam Lips, and Joe Organ. "Identification practices in government: citizen surveillance and the quest for public service improvement." Identity in the Information Society 1, no. 1 (2008): 135.
 Lips, Miriam. "Does public administration have artefacts?." Information Polity 12, no. 4 (2007): 243–252.

References

External links
 
 

1967 births
Living people
Dutch emigrants to New Zealand
Dutch women academics
New Zealand women academics
Erasmus University Rotterdam alumni
Academic staff of Tilburg University
Academics of the University of Oxford
Academic staff of the Victoria University of Wellington
New Zealand women writers